Bihor Mountains is a mountain range in western Romania. It is part of the Apuseni Mountains, which are part of the Carpathian Mountains. 

It is located east of the town Ștei, Bihor County and north of the town of Brad, Hunedoara County.

Other high peaks are Buteasa (1,790 m), Cârligatele (1,694 m), Piatra Grăitoare (1,658 m), and Bohodei (1,654 m).

Mountain ranges of Romania
Mountain ranges of the Western Romanian Carpathians
Western Romanian Carpathians